Urheilupuisto (Finnish) or Idrottsparken (Swedish) (lit. English "Sports park") is an underground metro station in Espoo on the Länsimetro (‘Western Metro’) extension of Helsinki metro. The station is located in western Tapiola, at the northern edge of Jousenpuisto Park and south of the Tapiolan Urheilupuisto (‘Tapiola Sports Park‘). A 790-space car park was built next to the metro station and offers elevator access to the station.

The station was designed by HKP Architects, in collaboration with many other design firms. During the design stage, the station was known as Jousenpuisto, after the park at its immediate south. The shape of the station building allows natural light to enter at street level and reach down to the platform level via the escalators. The metro station has won several international design awards as part of the eight-station first phase of the Länsimetro.

Urheilupuisto is unique among metro stations in Espoo, as it is not built into the bedrock. The station platform is located at a depth of about 27 meters below street level. Urheilupuisto station was designed to operate with only one entrance (on the western side of the building) but, in response to passenger feedback, an entrance was constructed in the eastern side and opened on 29 February 2020. The station is located 1,1 kilometres east from Niittykumpu metro station and 1,3 kilometres west from Tapiola metro station.

Pictures

References
Content in this article is translated from the existing Finnish Wikipedia article at :fi:Urheilupuiston metroasema; see its history for attribution.

External links
 Urheilupuisto station 
 Urheilupuiston asema 
 Idrottsparkens station 

Helsinki Metro stations
2017 establishments in Finland
Transport in Espoo